C. J. Walker (born March 29, 2001) is an American college basketball player for the UCF Knights of the American Athletic Conference (AAC). He previously played for the Oregon Ducks.

Early life and high school career
Walker lived in Bayside Queens, New York until age 11, when his family moved to Sanford, Florida. Due to Walker's height, in 5th grade his father decided to make him play with the 7th and 8th grade AAU Panthers traveling team. As a freshman, Walker played basketball for Seminole High School in Sanford. For his next two years, he transferred to Orlando Christian Prep in Orlando, Florida, where played with five-star recruit Nassir Little and won back-to-back Class 3A state titles and won MVP honors in both championship games. After his junior season, Walker emerged as a top player in his class with his travel team, Each 1 Teach 1. As a senior, he began playing for Oak Ridge High School in Orlando, averaging 15.8 points, 13.8 rebounds and 3.8 blocks per game. Walker was named Orlando Sentinel Player of the Year and Class 9A Player of the Year and was the runner-up to Vernon Carey Jr. for the Florida Mr. Basketball award. He was selected to play in the Jordan Brand Classic in April 2019.

Recruiting
Walker was heavily recruited by most of NCAA's top schools after back to back state championships and a breakout summer with E1T1 Elite. On November 21, 2018, Walker committed to play college basketball for Oregon over his other top offers, LSU and Miami (Florida). He was considered a five-star recruit by ESPN and Rivals and a four-star recruit by 247Sports.

College career

Oregon

On December 7, 2019, Walker made his first career start, due to a leg injury to Shakur Juiston, and scored a freshman season-high 18 points in an 89–64 win over Hawaii. He suffered a back injury against Alabama State on December 29. Walker played in his next game versus Colorado, before being sidelined with back and knee injuries until January 16, 2020. As a freshman, he averaged four points and 2.5 rebounds in 14.9 minutes per game. On July 1, Walker announced that he was transferring from Oregon to be closer to home.

UCF
On July 6, 2020, Walker announced that he was transferring to UCF. He made the decision to be closer to elderly and ailing family during the COVID-19 pandemic. He was granted a waiver for immediate eligibility on November 23. Walker became the first five-star recruit to ever play for UCF. As a sophomore, Walker averaged 7.0 points, 5.0 rebounds, and 1.7 blocks per game. He declared for the 2021 NBA draft, but ultimately opted to return to UCF.

Career statistics

College

|-
| style="text-align:left;"| 2019–20
| style="text-align:left;"| Oregon
| 28 || 7 || 14.9 || .381 || .290 || .486 || 2.5 || .3 || .4 || .5 || 4.0
|-
| style="text-align:left;"| 2020–21
| style="text-align:left;"| UCF
| 21 || 15 || 25.7 || .444 || .143 || .581 || 5.0 || .9 || .9 || 1.7 || 7.0
|-
| style="text-align:left;"| 2021–22
| style="text-align:left;"| UCF
| 30 || 19 || 25.2 || .479 || .371 || .582 || 5.7 || 1.0 || .3 || .9 || 8.3
|- class="sortbottom"
| style="text-align:center;" colspan="2"| Career
| 79 || 41 || 21.7 || .442 || .300 || .564 || 4.4 || .7 || .5 || 1.0 || 6.5

References

External links
UCF Knights bio
Oregon Ducks bio

2001 births
Living people
American men's basketball players
Basketball players from Florida
Oregon Ducks men's basketball players
People from Sanford, Florida
Power forwards (basketball)
UCF Knights men's basketball players